Henrique Córdova (21 December 1938 – 15 November 2020) was a Brazilian politician. He served as Governor of Santa Catarina from 1982 to 1983. He also served as a member of the Chamber of Deputies 1986 to 1991 and 1975 to 1979, as well as the Legislative Assembly of Santa Catarina from 1967 to 1975.

Biography
Vice-Governor during Jorge Bornhausen's leadership, Córdova succeeded him in 1982 following his resignation. He helped to improve the national standing of Santa Catarina, which earned him recognition in Brasília.

Cordova died from COVID-19 in November 2020, aged 83.

References

1938 births
2020 deaths
Governors of Santa Catarina (state)
People from Santa Catarina (state)
Deaths from the COVID-19 pandemic in Rio de Janeiro (state)